The 1950–51 National Hurling League was the 20th season of the National Hurling League.

National Hurling League

Tipperary came into the season as defending champions of the 1949-50 season.

On 30 September 1951, Galway won the title after a 2-11 to 2-8 win over New York in the final. It was their 2nd league title overall and their first since 1930-31.

Group A table

Group B table

Group C table

Group D table

Knock-out stage

Semi-finals

Home final

Final

References

National Hurling League seasons
League
League